Mount Allenby is a mountain summit in Alberta, Canada.

Description
Mount Allenby, elevation 2,995 meters, is set within Banff National Park, four kilometers east of the Continental Divide, and is situated near the southern end of the Sundance Range which is a subset of the Canadian Rockies. Precipitation runoff from the mountain drains into Allenby and Mercer creeks which empty to the nearby Spray Lakes Reservoir via Bryant Creek.

Etymology
Mount Allenby was named after Edmund Allenby, 1st Viscount Allenby (1861–1936), British Army field-marshal. The mountain's toponym was officially adopted in 1924 by the Geographical Names Board of Canada.

Geology
Mount Allenby is composed of sedimentary rock laid down during the Precambrian to Jurassic periods. Formed in shallow seas, this sedimentary rock was pushed east and over the top of younger rock during the Laramide orogeny.

Climate
Based on the Köppen climate classification, Mount Allenby is located in a subarctic climate zone with cold, snowy winters, and mild summers. Winter temperatures can drop below −20 °C with wind chill factors below −30 °C.

See also
 Geography of Alberta
 Geology of Alberta

References

External links
 Mount Allenby: weather forecast
 Parks Canada web site: Banff National Park

Two-thousanders of Alberta
Canadian Rockies
Alberta's Rockies
Mountains of Banff National Park